Jago Nicholas Aldo Eliot, Lord Eliot (24 March 1966 – 15 April 2006) was the son of Peregrine Eliot, 10th Earl of St Germans, and Jacquetta Eliot, Countess of St Germans (née Lampson).

Biography
In 1988, on the death of his grandfather, he became styled Lord Eliot. Educated at Millfield School, he was known for his hobbies of surfing and was the European body boarding champion in 1988.

Eliot was an early collaborator with Eddie Izzard at Covent Garden as a busker, he then moved to Brighton in the late 1980s where he inspired and promoted a number of nights at the ZAP club, including Fundamental and Pow Wow. He returned to Cornwall in the mid-1990s and in 2002 founded the Port Eliot Literature Festival, an annual event held in the grounds of the house.

Eliot worked with digital and creative projects, either with the Arts Council or the Port Eliot Literary Festival, and London Arts projects. Shortly before his death, Eliot had been awarded an Artist Fellowship in Creative Technology by Hewlett-Packard and was exploring invisible sculpture and 3D soundscapes.

He also began to develop strategies to ensure Port Eliot would continue to be a vibrant cultural laboratory, building on the legend of the Elephant Fayre and helping define the ethos of the Port Eliot Literary Festival, through conversations with friends such as Tom Hodgkinson of the Idler magazine. His passion for the arts saw him also involved with the A Foundation, through his Literati project and i-DAT with the A Conversation at Port Eliot in 2006. This was the first in a proposed series on emerging ideas in art, science and technology organised by Jago Eliot and The Institute of Digital Art and Technology at the University of Plymouth. The themes for this seminar were 'art and irrationality' and 'a geography of the immaterial'.

Marriage & children
Eliot married former model Bianca Ciambriello. The couple were first "married" in the "Lost Vagueness" garden at the Glastonbury Festival, before a more formal ceremony at Port Eliot, the seat of the Eliot family. The alternative wedding is featured in Julian Temple's 2006 film Glastonbury. They had one son and twin daughters:

 Ruby Eliot (born 7 April 2003)
 Violet Eliot (born 7 April 2003)
 Albert Eliot, 11th Earl of St Germans (born 2 November 2004)

Death
Eliot died on 15 April 2006. He was determined to have died from epilepsy, which he had developed in 2004.

References

External links
Obituary in the Western Morning News
 Review of the Elephant Fayre, 1983

1966 births
2006 deaths
People educated at Millfield
People from St Germans, Cornwall
Jago Eliot
Neurological disease deaths in England
Deaths from epilepsy
British courtesy barons and lords of Parliament
Heirs apparent who never acceded